or  , is a third class airport located  southeast of Monbetsu, a city on the Sea of Okhotsk in Hokkaidō, Japan. The airport is 15 minutes from the city center and accessible by bus from the Monbetsu Bus Terminal.

History

MBE is the newest airport in Hokkaidō: it opened in November 1999. The airport was originally used for general aviation flights. Flights were transferred from the original Monbetsu Airport, which was located further from the city. Air Nippon inaugurated daily service to New Chitose Airport outside Sapporo that year, and added flights to Tokyo International Airport in 2000. The Sapporo service was moved to Okadama Airport in 2001 and discontinued entirely in 2003. For a short period between July and November 2011, Hokkaido Air System offered one daily service to Okadama Airport.

In fiscal year 2008, Monbetsu Airport recorded an operating loss of 273 million yen on total revenues (chiefly landing fees received from ANA) of only 26 million yen, making its operating losses the highest among the six airports operated by the Hokkaido government. In 2011, the Hokkaido government announced that landing fees would be waived for international charter flights using the airport in an attempt to lure more overseas tourists to the region.

In the winter of 2013, ANA again started services to Sapporo, flying a daily 737-700 flight to New Chitose Airport.

Airlines and destinations

The airport has a two-story, 1,993 m² terminal building which is open daily from 8:30 a.m. to 5:00 p.m.

References

External links

  Okhotsk Monbetsu Airport at Monbetsu City website
  Okhotsk Monbetsu Airport at Okhotsk General Subprefectural Bureau website
  Okhotsk Monbetsu Airport terminal map from All Nippon Airways
 
 

Airports in Hokkaido